Sename Dové Womé Dobe (born 8 June 1991) is a Togolese professional footballer who plays as an attacking midfielder for Iraqi Premier League side Al-Diwaniya.

Club career
Womé was born in Fiokpo, Togo. He began his career with Maranatha F.C. and earned in the 2008–09 season his first 23 professional matches in the Togolese Championnat National, before was in October 2009 loaned to Liberty Professionals.

In January 2017 Womé joined Orlando Pirates on loan from SuperSport United.

On 27 July 2018, Virsliga side FK Ventspils announced the signing of Womé.

International career
Womé earned his first call up to the Togo national team on 6 September 2009 for the World Cup Qualifying match against Morocco and made his international debut for Togo one month later, in a friendly on 14 October 2009 against Japan. Womé scored a goal in a friendly match against Bahrain, lost by 1–5.

International goals
Scores and results list Togo's goal tally first, score column indicates score after each Womé goal.

Honours
SuperSport United
 Nedbank Cup: 2016

References

External links

1991 births
Living people
Togolese footballers
Association football midfielders
Togo international footballers
2013 Africa Cup of Nations players
Liberty Professionals F.C. players
Maranatha FC players
Free State Stars F.C. players
Mamelodi Sundowns F.C. players
Orlando Pirates F.C. players
Gomido FC players
FK Ventspils players
Al-Yarmouk SC (Kuwait) players
Al-Diwaniya FC players
South African Premier Division players
Latvian Higher League players
Kuwait Premier League players
Iraqi Premier League players
Togolese expatriate footballers
Togolese expatriate sportspeople in Ghana
Expatriate footballers in Ghana
Togolese expatriate sportspeople in South Africa
Expatriate soccer players in South Africa
Togolese expatriate sportspeople in Latvia
Expatriate footballers in Latvia
Togolese expatriate sportspeople in Kuwait
Expatriate footballers in Kuwait

Expatriate footballers in Iraq
21st-century Togolese people